Charles Oscar Hartenstein (May 26, 1942 – October 2, 2021) was an American professional baseball relief pitcher. He played in Major League Baseball (MLB) for five different teams between the 1966 and 1977 seasons. He was signed by the Chicago Cubs in 1964 out of the University of Texas at Austin. He played for them until 1968, before joining the Pittsburgh Pirates (1969–70), St. Louis Cardinals (1970), Boston Red Sox (1970) and Toronto Blue Jays (1977).

Career
A Texas Longhorns star pitcher, Hartenstein led his team to the 1962 and 1963 CWS tournaments. 

After being signed by Chicago, he led the Texas League with a 2.19 ERA in 1965 while pitching for the Dallas–Fort Worth Spurs. 

On June 17, 1965 Hartenstein had one of the most impressive pitching feats in Texas League history, in a game against the Austin Braves as the starter, the Spurs had a 1–0 lead going into the ninth inning when he gave up a tying run. The game continued that way with Hartenstein pitching 18 innings. He allowed only one run, eight hits, walked four and struck out seven. The game continued through the 25th inning with Austin winning 2–1. At the time it was the longest game in Texas League history.

Hartenstein entered the majors in 1965 with the Cubs, appearing in one game as a pinch runner. His most productive season came in 1967 while with Chicago, when he went 9–5 with a 3.08 ERA and 10 saves, all career-numbers. He also enjoyed a solid season with the 1969 Pirates, going 5–4 with a 3.85 ERA and 10 saves in a career-high 95 innings pitched.

Hartenstein was traded along with Glenn Redmon from the Chicago White Sox to the San Francisco Giants for Skip Pitlock on February 8, 1973.

In a six-season career, Hartenstein posted a 17–19 record with a 3.63 ERA and 23 saves in 187 relief appearances, including 88 games finished, a 1.52 strikeout-to-walk ratio (135-to-89), and 297 innings of work.

After six years of absence pitching in the minors, he played in his last major league season with the expansion Toronto Blue Jays in 1977. 

His nickname while with the Blue Jays was "Olde Frankenstein".

Following his playing career, Hartenstein coached for the Cleveland Indians (1979) and Milwaukee Brewers (1987–89). After he was fired by the Brewers, Hartenstein was hired to be a scout for the California Angels.

In 2004, Hartenstein was inducted into the Texas Athletics Hall of Honor.

Hartenstein died on October 2, 2021.

References

External links

Chuck Hartenstein at SABR (Baseball BioProject)

1942 births
2021 deaths
American expatriate baseball players in Canada
Baseball coaches from Texas
Baseball players from Texas
Boston Red Sox players
California Angels scouts
Chicago Cubs players
Cleveland Indians coaches
Dallas–Fort Worth Spurs players
Hawaii Islanders players
Louisville Colonels (minor league) players
Major League Baseball pitchers
Major League Baseball pitching coaches
Milwaukee Brewers coaches
People from Seguin, Texas
Phoenix Giants players
Pittsburgh Pirates players
St. Cloud Rox players
St. Louis Cardinals players
Tacoma Cubs players
Texas Longhorns baseball coaches
Texas Longhorns baseball players
Toronto Blue Jays players
Tucson Toros players